Fiatt is an unincorporated community in Fulton County, Illinois, United States. Fiatt has a post office with ZIP Code 61433, which opened on July 17, 1843.

References

Unincorporated communities in Fulton County, Illinois
Unincorporated communities in Illinois